Eurythecta phaeoxyla is a species of moth of the family Tortricidae. It is found in New Zealand. The habitat consists of swampy areas.

The wingspan is about 15 mm. The forewings are ochreous grey or grey with dark ochreous-brown markings. The hindwings are dark grey.

References

Moths described in 1938
Archipini
Moths of New Zealand